Ali Karami-ye Olya (also Romanized as ‘Alī Karamī-ye ‘Olyā; also known as ‘Alī Karamī and Deh Now-e ‘Alī Karamī) is a village in Chenar Rural District, Kabgian District, Dana County, Kohgiluyeh and Boyer-Ahmad Province, Iran. At the 2006 census, its population was 67, in 14 families.

References 

Populated places in Dana County